The Binyamina Winery is Israel's fifth largest, producing about 2.8 million bottles of wine annually.

History 
The winery was founded in 1952 by Joseph Zeltzer as Eliaz Winery in the town of Binyamina. In those early years it produced mostly sweet wines and table wines, although it was also known for producing liquors under the label Hard Nut, named after Israeli prime minister David Ben Gurion, who was a "hard nut to crack". In 1994 it was purchased by a group of investors who renamed the winery and invested in new vineyards and technology. In 2008 the winery was purchased by supermarket chain Hatzi Hinam.

Wines 
Binyamina's high-end wine label, Avnei Hachoshen, contains six wines. Each is names after one of the stones in the biblical priestly breastplate, called hachoshen in Hebrew.

The Tiltan label, named after the Hebrew word for a clover (which contains three leaves), contains wines which use grapes from three different vintages.

References

External links 
Winery homepage

Wineries of Israel